Scipione Salernitano (died 1581) was a Roman Catholic prelate who served as Bishop of Acerra (1571–1581).

On 16 July 1571, Scipione Salernitano was appointed during the papacy of Pope Pius V as Bishop of Acerra.
He served as Bishop of Acerra until his death in 1581.

References

External links and additional sources
 (for Chronology of Bishops) 
 (for Chronology of Bishops) 

16th-century Italian Roman Catholic bishops
Bishops appointed by Pope Pius V
1581 deaths